Pyrola picta, commonly called whiteveined wintergreen or whitevein shinleaf, is a perennial herb in the heath family. It is native to western North America from southwestern Canada to the southwestern United States.

References

External links
Calflora: Pyrola picta (White veined shinleaf,  White veined wintergreen)
Jepson Manual (TJM2) treatment of Pyrola picta
Washington Burke Museum
Pyrola picta - UC Photos gallery

picta
Flora of Western Canada
Flora of the Western United States
Flora of the Sierra Nevada (United States)
Flora of Oregon
Flora of Washington (state)
Flora of California
Flora of the Cascade Range
Flora of the Klamath Mountains
Natural history of the California chaparral and woodlands
Natural history of the California Coast Ranges
Natural history of the Peninsular Ranges
Natural history of the San Francisco Bay Area
Natural history of the Santa Monica Mountains
Natural history of the Transverse Ranges
Plants described in 1819
Flora without expected TNC conservation status